Stephen La Rivière (born November 1984) is a British film producer, writer and actor based in London. His directorial work includes the feature-length documentary Filmed in Supermarionation (2014), based on his book of the same name (2009).

The film led to the creation of three new Thunderbirds episodes entitled Thunderbirds: The Anniversary Episodes, as well as filmed inserts for the ITV drama Endeavour (2019) and a farewell documentary about the former AP Films studios, Century 21, Slough (2019). During the Covid-19 lockdown of 2020, he co-created and directed a new Supermarionation inspired series Nebula-75 for which he also performed voices.

References

External links
Website

1984 births
Film directors from London
People from Croydon
Living people